Javier Santaolalla Camino (August 31, 1982) is a Spanish physicist, engineer, doctor in particle physics and scientific popularizer. He has worked at the National Center for Space Studies in France, CIEMAT and the European Organization for Nuclear Research, where he was part of the team that discovered the Higgs boson through the Large Hadron Collider from CMS Experiment.

Biography
Javier Santaolalla Camino was born in Burgos, Spain. He studied Telecommunications Engineering at the University of Las Palmas de Gran Canaria and has a degree in physical sciences from the Complutense University of Madrid. After being accepted at CERN to study for a master's degree, he received his doctorate in particle physics, also from the UCM, in 2012, with a thesis on electroweak processes in muon decay in the CMS experiment at the LHC. He has also coordinated the educational innovation project Creations, funded by the European Union.

Along with Santi García Cremades, Ana Payo Payo and Eduardo Sáenz de Cabezón, he is a member of the Big Van Ciencia group since 2013, dedicated to scientific outreach events. He participates in Órbita Laika, a late night science of scientific popularizer and humor talk show broadcast on the Spanish network La 2. He is the creator of the YouTube channels Date un voltio, Date un vlog, Date Un Short. For his scientific humor monologue for the Famelab contest, he received the 2015 Aquae Award. He has been described by Infolibre as "the greatest Spanish scientific popularizer on the web". Since February 2021, together with Schrödinger's cat, he has presented the program Whaat!? How do you see it, from the RTVE digital platform, playz.

Selected works 
 
 
 Santaolalla, Javier (2022) ¿Qué hace un bosón como tú en un Big Bang como este? p. 404

As co-author

References

External links 
 Personal web sitie 
 Big van science 

1982 births
Living people
Spanish YouTubers
University of Las Palmas de Gran Canaria alumni
21st-century Spanish physicists
Complutense University of Madrid alumni